The 2016–17 Idaho Vandals women's basketball team represented the University of Idaho during the 2016–17 NCAA Division I women's basketball season. The Vandals, led by ninth year head coach Jon Newlee, played their home games at the Cowan Spectrum with early season games at Memorial Gym, and were members of the Big Sky Conference. They finished the season 19–15, 11–7 in Big Sky play to finish in fifth place. They advanced to the quarterfinals of the Big Sky women's tournament where they lost to Eastern Washington. They were invited to the Women's Basketball Invitational where defeated Utah State in the first round, Eastern Washington in the quarterfinals before losing in the semifinals to Rice.

Roster

Schedule

|-
!colspan=9 style=| Exhibition

|-
!colspan=9 style=| Non-conference regular season

|-
!colspan=9 style=| Big Sky regular season

|-
!colspan=9 style=| Big Sky Women's Tournament

|-
!colspan=9 style=| WBI

See also
2016–17 Idaho Vandals men's basketball team

References

Idaho Vandals women's basketball seasons
Idaho
Idaho
Van
Van